The Taigu school (太谷学派 Tàigǔ xuépài), also Great Perfection (大成教 Dàchéng jiào) or Yellow Cliff teaching (黄崖教 Huángyá jiào), is a mystical folk religious sect of Confucianism spread especially in Jiangsu, Anhui and Shandong. It was founded by Zhou Xingyuan, a man with shamanic skills entitled Taigu (太谷 "Great Valley") by followers.

The purpose of the school is to help those who practice it to develop a clear and enlightened state of mind, in which man apprehends his true nature and recovers original simplicity.

See also
 Confucianism
 Chinese folk religion

References

Sources
 
 

Religious Confucianism
Confucian schools of thought
Chinese folk religion in Asia
History of Chinese philosophy
Religion in Qing dynasty
Three teachings